The High Peak by-election was a Parliamentary by-election held on 22 July 1909. The constituency returned one Member of Parliament (MP) to the House of Commons of the United Kingdom, elected by the first past the post voting system.

Vacancy
Oswald Partington had been Liberal MP for the seat of High Peak since the 1900 general election. On 5 July 1909, he was appointed as a Junior Lord of the Treasury, which meant, in accordance with the times, that he was required to resign his seat and seek re-election to parliament.

Electoral history
The seat had been Liberal since Partington gained it from the Conservatives in 1900. He easily held the seat at the last election, with an increased majority;

Candidates
The local Liberal Association re-selected 37-year-old Oswald Partington to defend the seat. 
The Conservatives retained 30-year-old barrister Albert Profumo as their candidate. He had unsuccessfully tried to re-gain the seat from Partington at the last election.

Campaign

Polling Day was fixed for 22 July, allowing for a short 17-day campaign.

On 9 July the Liberals retained a by-election in Cleveland, Yorkshire. On 15 July, the Liberals retained a by-election in nearby Mid Derbyshire. On 20 July, the Liberals retained a by-election in Dumfries Burghs.

The major incident of the campaign was Partington's challenge to fight a reporter of the Sheffield Daily Telegraph. The presses of that paper had been used to print the High Peak Elector, a campaign newspaper published by the Conservatives, which Partington claimed had slighted his wife, Clara.

Result
The Liberals held the seat and managed a slightly reduced majority;

Aftermath
Partington retained the seat at the following General Election;

References

High Peak by-election
High Peak by-election
High Peak by-election
1900s in Derbyshire
By-elections to the Parliament of the United Kingdom in Derbyshire constituencies